Mihail Kolganov (born 9 May 1980) is a Kazakhstani former middle distance runner who specialized in the 800 and 1500 metres.

In the 800 metres he won the gold medal at the 2002 Asian Championships and finished seventh at the 2002 World Cup. He also competed at the 2004 Olympic Games, but did not progress past the first heat. His personal best time is 1:46.99 minutes, achieved in June 2004 in Almaty.

In the 1500 metres he finished twelfth at the 2003 Universiade, tenth at the 2005 Universiade and fifth at the 2005 Asian Championships. His personal best time is 3:45.65 minutes, achieved in June 2006 in Tula.

He also finished seventh in the 4x400 metres relay at the 2005 Summer Universiade.

Achievements

1Did not start in the semifinal

References

1980 births
Living people
Kazakhstani male middle-distance runners
Athletes (track and field) at the 2004 Summer Olympics
Olympic athletes of Kazakhstan
Athletes (track and field) at the 2002 Asian Games
Asian Games competitors for Kazakhstan
Competitors at the 2003 Summer Universiade
Competitors at the 2005 Summer Universiade
21st-century Kazakhstani people